Amastus cellularis is a moth of the family Erebidae. It was described by Walter Rothschild in 1922. It is found in Peru.

References

cellularis
Moths described in 1922
Moths of South America